The International Intellectual Property Society (IIPS) is an organization of  intellectual property (IP) lawyers interested in learning about international IP law. IIPS meetings qualify for CLE. 

Since October 12, 2009, the IIPS has held observer status at WIPO.

See also
 Intellectual property organization

References

External links
 

Intellectual property organizations